arman ali verdi Town is a planned town in western Tehran, Iran. It is located approximately five kilometers west of central Tehran.

Etymology
The town is named after Ecbatana, the capital city of the ancient Median Empire around 700 BC. It was the first capital of ancient Iranians to be established in Western Asia, and is the ancestor of the modern city of Hamedan.

The word Ekbātān is a variant of Ecbatana which derives from Old Persian Haŋgmetana, meaning "place of gathering".

History

Construction
The construction of Ekbatan was started in 1975, for the purpose of mass housing. It was designed by Rahman Golzar, and American architecture firm ‘Gruzen Partnership’. Phase 1 of the town was then successfully built and completed by the American company Starrett, before the 1979 Revolution.

At the beginning, Ekbatan was the largest property development by a privately held company in Western Asia. The constructors also owned Ekbatan Bank, which was one of the fastest growing privately held banks in Western Asia. The constructor group was owned in majority by Rahman Golzar and his family, and in minority by Mohammad Ali Bagherzadeh. In 1977, Mohammad Ali Bagherzadeh transferred his shares in the group to his children Ali and Goli.

After the 1979 Revolution

Following the 1979 Revolution, the new incoming government nationalized the group and all its subsidiaries and affiliates, and placed its ownership with the Ministry of Housing, it was later sold to public and is now privately owned. Ekbatan Bank was nationalized at the same time, subsumed into the new state bank created to be the successor to Iran's privately held banks.

Infrastructure

Phases
Ekbatan has 15,500 units on an area of 2,208,570 square meters. It has three separate sets of buildings called phases, and each phase has independent buildings categorized as a block. The architecture in the first and third phases are similar, and are very different from Phase 2. Each block of Phase 1 (and of Phase 3) has three major steps. When looked at from the sides, there are five floors in first step, nine in second and twelve in the third one. At Phase 2, blocks are designed like huge twelve-story box-shaped parts that are put together in an angle. Another difference between Phase 1 (or Phase 3) and Phase 2 is the interior layout of the apartments. At Phase 1 (and Phase 3), apartments are single-floored. However, at Phase 2, they are built mostly in double floors (duplex) with hall, and the kitchen in the first floor and rooms placed in the upper (second) floor. At all of these phases you could find one-, two-, three- or four-roomed apartments that begin from about 50 m2 to 240 m2.

There are frequent green fields between the buildings in Ekbatan. The landscape is designed in a way to combine nature and modern living together; a concept that, due to environmental concerns, is being explored more in architectural practices.

There are several different level schools in all three phases of Ekbatan. The town also has a variety of shopping places, such as the Mega Mall located at Phase 2, which have developed within the recent years.

Transportation

The town is served by Ekbatan (Shahrak-e Ekbatan) and Ekbatan (Eram-e Sabz) stations of the Tehran Metro system.

The main boulevard in Phase 2 is named after IRNA reporter Mahmoud Saremi, a terrorism-victim killed by Taliban while working in Mazar-i-Sharif.

Culture
On the last Wednesday eve of the Iranian year, before Nowruz, Ekbatan is the host of one of the biggest Charshanbe Suri festivals in Tehran.

Ekbatan is also famous for its graffiti artworks, and is the place-of-origin of artists such as A1one and Oham.

Ekbatan is known to have a vibrant underground music scene and several independent musicians started their artistic activities in Ekbatan; the rock band 127, and the rapper Rez are some prominent examples.

Sport

The Ekbatan Stadium ( the Rah Ahan Stadium) is located in Ekbatan Town. Formerly known as the Apadana Stadium, it was owned by Persepolis F.C., and is today the home stadium of Rah Ahan F.C. It was one of the hosts of preliminary round of the football matches at the 1974 Asian Games (Group A and Group C).

The Dastgerdi Stadium (a.k.a. the Pas Stadium) is also located in Ekbatan Town. It is where the former Pas F.C. was based in, and now hosts the national under-20 football team of Iran. It was also home to the 2005 Iranian Super Cup between Foolad and Saba Battery football clubs.

Ekbatan and Dastgerdi stadiums hosted the 2012 AFC U-16 Championship.

References

Neighbourhoods in Tehran
Planned communities